3rd Regiment may refer to:

British Army
 3rd Regiment of Foot = The Buffs (Royal East Kent Regiment)
 3rd Regiment of Foot Guards = Scots Guards
 3rd Regiment Royal Horse Artillery

Greek Army
 3rd Infantry Regiment (Greece)
 3/40 Evzone Regiment
 3rd Serres Regiment

Lithuanian Army 

 3rd Infantry Regiment (Lithuania)

Norwegian Army
3rd Infantry Regiment (Norway)

Philippine Commonwealth Army
3rd Infantry Regiment (Philippine Commonwealth Army)

Philippine Constabulary
 3rd Constabulary Regiment (Philippine Constabulary) - The 3rd Infantry Regiment, Philippine Constabulary was the military establishment and active on 1935 to 1942 as the military command of the United States of America and stationed during the Fall of Bataan and Corregidor. 
 3rd Infantry Regiment (Philippine Constabulary) - The 3rd Infantry Regiment, Philippine Constabulary was the military establishment and active on 1944 to 1946 as the military command of the United States of America and stationed in Central Luzon.

United States Army
 3rd Armored Cavalry Regiment (United States)
 3rd Aviation Regiment (United States)
 3rd Infantry Regiment (United States)
 3rd Regiment Illinois Volunteer Cavalry
 3rd Regiment Iowa Volunteer Cavalry
 3rd Regiment Indiana Cavalry
 3rd Regiment Kentucky Volunteer Cavalry
 3rd Regiment Kentucky Volunteer Infantry
 3rd Regiment, New York State Artillery (redesignated as the 1st Battalion, 258th Field Artillery (United States))
 3rd Regiment South Carolina Volunteer Infantry (African Descent)

Yugoslav Air Force
3rd Training Aviation Regiment
3rd Air Reconnaissance Regiment